The Kowloon Motor Bus Company (1933) Limited (KMB) is a bus company operating franchised services in Hong Kong. It is the largest bus company in Hong Kong by fleet size and number of bus routes. It is a subsidiary of Transport International.

Its slogan is Heartbeat of the City (Chinese: 城市脈搏) since 2017. Previously, it was Moving Forward Every Day (Chinese: 九巴服務 日日進步, literally KMB service improves every day), which was introduced in 1985.

History

KMB was founded on 13 April 1933 as a result of the reformation of public transport by the Hong Kong Government. Before the reformation, there were several independent bus operators working on both sides of Victoria Harbour including KMB.

The Hong Kong Government enforces the bus franchises in favour of the franchisees, while it prosecutes the operators of unauthorised private bus services and other types of authorised bus service that pick up or drop off passengers in franchised bus parking zones.

The KMB franchise allowed for the operation of public omnibus service on the Kowloon side as well as the New Territories. By 11 June 1933, KMB had a fleet of 106 single-deck buses.

The founding members of KMB were:
Tang Shiu-kin (鄧肇堅)
William Louey Sui Tak (雷瑞德)
Lui Leung (雷亮)
Tam Woon Tong (譚煥堂)
Lam Ming Fan (林明勳)

By December 1941, KMB had 140 single-deckers operating on 17 routes. As only a handful of buses survived World War II, some lorries were temporarily converted into buses. By the late 1940s, KMB ridership increased with the huge influx of immigration from Mainland China. In 1949, KMB bought 20 Daimler double-deckers from England, becoming the first operator of double-deckers in Hong Kong.

Following the opening of the Cross-Harbour Tunnel in 1972, KMB operated a number of cross-harbour routes jointly with China Motor Bus, the sole bus operator on Hong Kong Island. This marked the first time KMB buses running on the island. In the same year, KMB began experimenting with buses operating without a fare collector. All passengers would board from the front door and pay the fare by putting money into the collection box next to the driver.

In 1996, KMB launched an advertising campaign to promote modern image. It is the first bus company advertising in Hong Kong.

On 1 June 1997, KMB formed a subsidiary, Long Win Bus, to provide service on the Lantau Link to the new Hong Kong International Airport and Tung Chung. In 1998, KMB extended its business into mainland China with a co-operative joint venture, Dalian Hong Kong Macau Company. In 1999, due to the abuse of the free fare imposed on KCR East Rail feeder routes (K12 - K18) as non-franchised buses, the KCR signed a contract with KMB which stated that these routes are operated de facto by the KMB as franchised bus routes while all profits goes to the KCR corportation; This contract is still in effect after the KCR-MTR merger.

In July 2007, KMB commenced operating a 10-year franchise, that has since been renewed until June 2027.

Routes
As of October 2019, KMB operated 642 routes in Kowloon and the New Territories, and operates cross-harbour tunnel routes in which some are operated in co-operation with the two other bus operators Citybus and New World First Bus, while some are operated by themselves solely. The following is the numbering system of bus routes that the KMB currently adapts:

Numbering System by numbers and district 
1-29, 201-229: Kowloon Peninsula (Except route 14S, which terminates at Tseung Kwan O Chinese Permanent Cemetery located in Sai Kung District)
30-49, 230-249: Kwai Tsing District and Tsuen Wan District
50-69, 250-269: Tuen Mun District and Yuen Long District (Except route 65R, which serves the Tai Po District exclusively)
70-79, 270-279: Tai Po District and Northern District
80-89, 280-289: Sha Tin District
90-99, 290-299: Sai Kung District
100-199: Cross harbour routes via the Cross-Harbour Tunnel
300-399: Express peak hour cross harbour routes with using any harbour crossing tunnel
600-699: Cross harbour routes via the Eastern Harbour Crossing
900-999: Cross harbour Routes via the Western Harbour Crossing

Routes 200-299 previously meant deluxe bus services provided by the KMB (similar to the P prefix shown below), and in the 1990s, all 2xx routes provided air conditioned bus services only. Since the withdrawal of the last non air-conditioned bus in 2012, all bus routes operated by the KMB uses air-conditioned buses, hence this assignment had practically lost its meaning.

Letter Assignments in bus routes
Prefixes
A: Airport Routes, operates none currently due to the closure of Kai Tak Airport. 
B: Border area routes
H: Hospital routes, operated one during the 2002–2004 SARS outbreak
K: Feeder routes to railway lines operated formerly by the Kowloon–Canton Railway Corporation, de facto operated by the MTR (not to be confused with the K prefix routes operated by the MTR themselves)
M: Feeder routes to the Airport Express (MTR), now cancelled
N: Overnight routes
P: Deluxe bus services for cross-harbour new territories routes (eg. P960, P968)
R: Routes for special events
T: Express bus routes to help relief the heavy passenger load of the East Rail line
W: Feeder routes to the Shenzhen–Hong Kong high-speed train terminus at West Kowloon Station
X: Express routes 
Y: Routes operated during Typhoons for Park Island
Suffixes:
A-F: May represent independent routes (eg. 59A & 59X) or branches of a main route (eg. 31A & 31M)
E: Express bus routes for some cases such as 40E and 87E
H: Hospital routes (eg. 14H, 32H)
K: Feeder routes to railway lines operated formerly by the Kowloon–Canton Railway Corporation (not to be confused with the K prefix)
M: Feeder routes to railway lines operated by the MTR Corporation
P: Peak hour routes, although some provide full day services (eg. 40P)
R: Routes operated during public holidays and/or public events with the exception of 5R, which provides full day service
S: Special routes, including some overnight routes, routes operated due to big events or peak hour routes
X: Express bus routes

Fares
Passengers pay the fare in cash (no change given) or using an Octopus card, a smart card payment system. Discounts apply for Octopus users on specified route interchange combinations. To enable elderly people and eligible persons with disabilities to travel on the general Mass Transit Railway (MTR) lines, franchised buses and ferries are charged concessionary fare of $2 per trip, starting from 2012. The scheme aims to help build a caring and inclusive society by encouraging these groups to participate more in community activities.

In 2018, KMB launched the KMB Monthly Pass. Fares are fixed at HK$780, and are not applicable to MTR Feeder Bus services operated by KMB. Holders are able to take 10 rides on ordinary routes and 2 rides on route B1 per day during the validity month of the pass. Passes can be purchased using an Octopus card at machines installed at major public transport interchanges and bus terminals.

Fleet
As of the end of 2021, Kowloon Motor Bus operated a fleet of 4001 buses. 584 Euro VI buses (including 3 diesel-electric buses), 2,935 Euro V buses and 10 battery-electric buses.

KMB traditionally purchased buses from English manufacturers including AEC, Daimler, Dennis, Guy Motors, Leyland, Metro Cammell Weymann and Seddon, that either were bodied in England or locally.

In 1975, the first air-conditioned bus in Hong Kong was put into service by KMB. Following the testing of double-deck air-conditioned buses Victory and Jubilant in the early 1980s, KMB became the world's first operator of such buses. All purchases after 1995 were for air-conditioned buses. In May 2012, KMB withdrew its last non-air-conditioned buses from service.

In the late 1970s, it began to purchase chassis from European manufacturers MAN, Mercedes-Benz, Scania and Volvo.

KMB's original liveries were combinations of red and cream. In the early 1990s, a white and grey livery was introduced for air-conditioned buses, followed in 1997 by a champagne livery. In June 2017, a red and silver livery was introduced, as well as a new logo, dropping its character and Chinese slogan, retaining only the wordmark, but with a darker shade of red.

Some of the newer third-generation buses have solar photovoltaic panels installed on the roof which reduces fuel use by 5-8% which would otherwise be used for the air conditioner. This is expected to reduce  of carbon emissions on each bus per year.

KMB expects to have 500 battery electric buses by the end of 2025, which will account for an eighth of the total bus fleet.

Depots
KMB operate four depots in Kowloon and the New Territories. The depot of a bus is identified by the letter K, L, S, or U, and the letter is marked on the bottom left of the driver's windscreen or below windscreen. The assignment scheme is as follows:
K: Kowloon Bay depot
Subsidiary depot: Tseung Kwan O depot
L: Lai Chi Kok (Stonecutters Island) depot
Subsidiary depots: Yuet Lun Street depot, Tsing Yi depot
S: Sha Tin (Siu Lek Yuen) depot
Subsidiary depots: Tai Po depot, Sheung Shui depot (Sheung Shui depot was previously under the Tuen Mun depot until 2009)
U: Formerly Un Long (Yuen Long) depot, currently Tuen Mun depot
Subsidiary depots: Tuen Mun South depot, Yuen Long depot, Tin Shui Wai depot, Sheung Shui depot (until 2009)

In addition, these depots with the exception of the Kowloon Bay Depot are responsible for the maintenece of part of the fleet owned by Long Win Bus, since the KMB and LWB are owned by the same parent company.

Football team

Kowloon Motor Bus also has a Hong Kong football club, Kowloon Motor Bus Co. It was formed in 1947 and joined Hong Kong First Division League in the 1947/48 season. Nicknamed "Atomic Bus", the team obtained the only two league titles in 1953/54 and 1966/67. The team attained its peak in the 1950s and 1960s when the "South China - Kowloon Motor Bus Co. crash" was one of the highlighted rival matches in Hong Kong. In 1970/71, the team faced their first relegation, but was able to stay in the First Division as Jardines quit the league in the following season. However, the team were relegated in 1972/73. It made its last First Division League appearance in 1976/77, but was relegated after only one season. The football team quit the league in 1981 and reformed in 2017.

See also
 2003 Tuen Mun Road bus accident – Deadliest accident in Hong Kong's history
 2018 Hong Kong bus accident
 The Bus Uncle – a 2006 incident filmed on a KMB bus that became an internet phenomenon
 Transport in Hong Kong

References

Further reading

External links 

 
Historic photos on Flickr

 
Bus companies of Hong Kong
Companies formerly listed on the Hong Kong Stock Exchange
Former companies in the Hang Seng Index
Transport companies established in 1933
1933 establishments in Hong Kong
1980 mergers and acquisitions
1997 mergers and acquisitions